A treaty of friendship, also known as a friendship treaty, is a common generic name for any treaty establishing close ties between countries. Friendship treaties have been used for agreements about use and development of resources, territorial integrity, access to harbours, trading lanes and fisheries, and promises of cooperation. Whilst not common, there are some treaties agreeing to some forms of military alliance which have use friendship terminology in their titles, as well as some non-aggression pacts. Additionally, friendship treaties have also signalled an independent relationship with emerging states.

History 
Ancient Greeks distinguished between three different types of friendships between two polities: Philiai, symmachia, and epimachia. Both symmachia and epimachia were types of alliances, with the former committing States to support each other in battle and the latter requiring parties to assist each other if one suffered an invasion. Philiai, then, made the important distinction of denoting friendship between polities but did not give the treaty partners the status of allies. Romans had a similar word amicitia, which was a state of diplomatic relations which could coexist with an alliance, or exist without it. The Romans employed a practice of establishing peace and friendship with polities on its peripheries, though in practice these relationships were usually built on unequal treaties, requiring the neighbour to support Rome militarily, though not necessarily the reverse.

In most cases, the friendship treaties are not based on equal partnership. This is particularly the case in treaties between aboriginal nations and the colonizers, both in America and in the Pacific, throughout the Colonial era. These treaties, often written primarily in the language of the coloniser, manipulated the terminology of friendship by the larger powers in order to create an environment of trust, primarily for the benefit of themselves. While promising protection in return for these benefits, the treaties are more subtle ways of accessing resources for commercial exploitation of smaller nations.

Since the early 2000s, friendship in international relations has been under closer analysis. Whilst friendship terminology had always been used in discourse and diplomacy, the analysis of friendship in international relations had been dismissed as merely being synonymous with good relations. In 2007, Felix Berenskoetter called for the inclusion of friendship analysis into international relations and since then a modest body of literature around the concept has been formed.

Terminology 

In the Soviet Union, Agreement of Friendship, Cooperation, and Mutual Assistance or Treaty of Friendship, Cooperation and Mutual Assistance (Russian: Договор о дружбе, сотрудничестве и взаимопомощи) was a standard Russian language reference to various treaties both internally, between the Soviet Republics, and externally, with countries considered friendly. This terminology is still in use for some post-Soviet states. The terminology was used in many so-called "friendship treaties" the Soviet Union made, but also was used in the Warsaw Pact.

In the United States, these types of treaties are commonly a Treaty of Friendship, Commerce and Navigation. More than a hundred "Treaties of Friendship, Commerce, and Navigation" have been signed since independence. Since 1946, these treaties have dealt with commercial matters concerned with the protection of persons, natural and juridical, and of the property and interests of such persons. They define the treatment each country owes the nationals of the other; their rights to engage in business and other activities within the boundaries of the former; and the respect due them, their property and their enterprises.

List of Friendship Treaties

See also
Treaty
Commercial treaty
List of treaties

References 

Treaties